Cymegesolate (developmental code name Progestin No. 1), also known as cypionyl megestrol acetate or as megestrol acetate 3β-cypionate, is a progestin medication which was never marketed. It was developed in China in the late 1970s and early to mid 1980s for use as a hormonal contraceptive. The medication was formulated at a dose of 50–100 mg in combination with a "trace" dose of 0.25–0.5 mg quinestrol as a long-lasting, once-a-month combined oral contraceptive pill. This combination has been studied in 1,213 women across a total of 9,651 menstrual cycles, with contraceptive effectiveness of over 99.13% and "very few side effects." At the high dose (100 mg / 0.5 mg), it showed an anovulation rate of only about 60%, and instead mediated its contraceptive effects via a marked anti-implantation effect.

Chemistry

Cymegesolate, also known as megestrol acetate 3β-cypionate, as well as 17α-acetoxy-6-dehydro-6-methylprogesterone 3β-cyclopentylpropionate or 17α-acetoxy-6-methylpregna-4,6-diene-3,20-dione 3β-cyclopentylpropionate, is a synthetic pregnane steroid and a derivative of progesterone and 17α-hydroxyprogesterone. It is the C3β cypionate (cyclopentylpropionate) ester of megestrol acetate. A closely related medication is acetomepregenol (mepregenol diacetate; also known as megestrol 3β,17α-diacetate), which, in contrast, has been marketed.

References

Abandoned drugs
Acetate esters
Carboxylate esters
Conjugated dienes
Cyclopentanes
Hormonal contraception
Ketones
Pregnanes
Prodrugs
Progestogens